Andrew Allison "Hank" Frierson (June 23, 1902 – September 24, 1982) was an American equestrian. He competed in two events at the 1948 Summer Olympics.

Biography
Hank Frierson was born in Knoxville, Tennessee on June 23, 1902.

He attended the United States Military Academy at West Point, graduating in 1924. He went on to become a colonel, serving with the Ninth Army during World War II, and was decorated with the Silver Star Medal, the Legion of Merit, the Bronze Star Medal, and the Croix de Guerre.

He died in El Paso, Texas on September 24, 1982, and was buried at Arlington National Cemetery.

References

External links
 

1902 births
1982 deaths
American male equestrians
Olympic equestrians of the United States
Equestrians at the 1948 Summer Olympics
Sportspeople from Knoxville, Tennessee
Burials at Arlington National Cemetery